The Time Reading Program (TRP) was a book sales club run by Time–Life, the publisher of Time magazine, from 1962 through 1966. Time was known for its magazines, and nonfiction book series' published under the Time-Life imprint, while the TRP books were reprints of an eclectic set of literature, both classic and contemporary, as well as nonfiction works and topics in history. The books were chosen by National Book Award judge Max Gissen, the chief book reviewer for Time from 1947 until the TRP began in 1962.

The books themselves were published by Time Inc. and followed a specific format across their widely varying subject matter. The editions were trade paperbacks, with covers constructed of very stiff plastic-coated paper, for durability. The books were eight inches tall, just less than an inch taller than a standard mass-market or "rack" paperback. Each book had a wraparound cover with a continuous piece of artwork across both covers and the spine, generally a painting by a contemporary artist, commissioned specifically for the TRP edition. The TRP covers attracted a measure of acclaim at the time. According to Time, 19 TRP covers were cited in 1964 for awards from The American Institute of Graphic Arts, Commercial Art Magazine and the Society of Illustrators guild. Typography and other printing credits were given in a colophon on the end pages, in the manner of sophisticated publishing houses like Alfred A. Knopf. The William Addison Dwiggins typeface Caledonia was typically used. The logo for the series was in format of a monogram, "RTP", enclosed in a rounded slightly rectangular box.

While not, strictly speaking, original publications,  most of the TRP books had unique introductions written by various scholars specifically for the TRP edition. In a few cases, the texts had also been revised by the authors to create a definitive edition, and did not constitute abridgement.

Subscribers to the TRP typically received four books a month, though some books arrived as multi-volume sets. Included with shipments was a small newsletter describing the books and why they were chosen.

Time revived the program in the early 1980s, with many of the same titles.

Series bibliography

(Books listed by year of reprint publication. Original publication date not given. Authors who provided their own introductions are indicated with an "‡")

1962
The American Character,  D. W. Brogan
The Power and the Glory, Graham Greene‡
Reveille in Washington, Margaret Leech 
The Worldly Philosophers, Robert L. Heilbroner
Mister Johnson, Joyce Cary, introduction by V.S. Pritchett, cover by James Spanfeller
King Solomon's Ring, Konrad Lorenz, foreword by Julian Huxley
The Reason Why, Cecil Woodham-Smith, Introduction by Gordon A. Craig
The Crime of Galileo, Giorgio de Santillana
The Ox-Bow Incident, Walter Van Tilburg Clark
Walden, Henry David Thoreau, cover by James Spanfeller
The River and the Gauntlet, S. L. A. Marshall
Admiral of the Ocean Sea a life of Christopher Columbus, vol 1 and 2, Samuel Eliot Morison
The Plague, Albert Camus
Burmese Days, George Orwell
Shakespeare, Ivor Brown
Notre Dame of Paris, Allan Temko
The Great Crash 1929, John Kenneth Galbraith
Lanterns and Lances, James Thurber
The Universe and Dr. Einstein, Lincoln Barnett
The Trial of Dr. Adams, Sybille Bedford
Darkness at Noon, Arthur Koestler
The Immense Journey, Loren Eiseley
The Story of Philosophy, Will Durant

1963
Karl Marx: His Life and Environment, Isaiah Berlin, introduction by Robert Heilbroner
The Martian Chronicles, Ray Bradbury, introduction by Fred Hoyle
Apes, Angels, and Victorians, William Irvine, introduction by Sir Julian Huxley, cover design by Richard Rosenblum
The Late George Apley, John P. Marquand
The Treasure of the Sierra Madre, B. Traven
The Devil in Massachusetts, Starkey
The Lost Weekend, Charles Jackson
The Bridge of San Luis Rey, Thornton Wilder
Lions, Harts, Leaping Does and Other Stories, Powers
The Greek Way, Edith Hamilton
In Defense of Women, H.L. Mencken
The Screwtape Letters, Lewis
One Day In the Life of Ivan Denisovich, Aleksandr Solzhenitsyn
Out of Africa, Dinesen
The True Believer, Hoffer
Brave New World, Aldous Huxley
A High Wind in Jamaica, Hughes
All the King's Men, Robert Penn Warren
The American Presidency, Clinton Rossiter
In Flanders Fields, Leon Wolff

1964
Mistress to an Age: A life of Madame de Staël, J. Christopher Herold
Christ Stopped at Eboli, Carlo Levi
The Bridge Over the River Kwai, Pierre Boulle and Xan Fielding
Eastern Approaches, Fitzroy Maclean
The Big Sky, A. B. Guthrie
Saints and Strangers, George F. Willison
The Sea And The Jungle, H.M. Tomlinson
The Sword in the Stone, White
A Preface to Morals, Lippmann
A Portrait of the Artist as a Young Man, James Joyce
Memento Mori, Muriel Spark
Murder for Profit, Bolitho
The Beast of the Haitian Hills, Marcelin
The Roots of Heaven, Romain Gary
Elizabeth the Great, Jenkins
Bend Sinister, Vladimir Nabokov‡
The Forest and the Sea, Marston Bates
John Paul Jones, Morison
Three Men in a Boat, Jerome K. Jerome
Three Who Made a Revolution, Volume 1, Bertram D. Wolfe
Three Who Made a Revolution, Volume 2, Bertram D. Wolfe
The Education of Henry Adams, Volume 1, Henry Adams
The Education of Henry Adams, Volume 2, Henry Adams
Doctor and the Devils, Dylan Thomas

1965
I, Claudius: From the autobiography of Tiberius Claudius, born B.C. 10, murdered and deified A.D. 54, Robert Graves
The Edge of Day: A Boyhood In The West of England, Laurie Lee, drawings by John Ward
Attending Marvels: A Patagonian Journal, George Gaylord Simpson
Logbook For Grace:Whaling Brig Daisy 1912-1913, Robert Cushman Murphy
The Wapshot Chronicle, John Cheever
Three Came Home, Agnes Newton Keith
Napoleon's Russian campaign, Philippe-Paul Seìoui
Animal Farm, George Orwell
 Kabloona, Gontran de Poncins
Disraeli, Maurois
Bread and Wine, Ignazio Silone
Fancies and Goodnights, John Collier
The Member of the Wedding, Carson McCullers
The Great Rehearsal, Carl Van Doren
The Horse's Mouth, Joyce Cary
Delilah, Goodrich
The Day of the Locust, Nathanael West
The Voice at the Back Door, Spencer
Naked to Mine Enemies: Volume 1, Ferguson
Naked to Mine Enemies: Volume 2, Ferguson
The Sea of Grass, Conrad Richter
Bring Out Your Dead, Powell
Wind, Sand and Stars, Saint-Exupéry
Man and the Living World, Von Frisch
Cider With Rosie, Laurie Lee

1966
The Decline of Pleasure, Walter Kerr, introduction by Phyllis McGinley
The Natural, Bernard Malamud, cover design by Karl W. Stücklen, introduction by Roger Angell
Wickford Point, John P. Marquand, introduction by Edward Weeks
Watchers at the Pond, Franklin Russell, illustrations by Robert W. Arnold, introduction by Gerald Durrell
Till We Have Faces, Lewis
When the Cheering Stopped: The last years of Woodrow Wilson, Gene Smith
Cross Creek, Rawlings
The Man of the Renaissance, Roeder
The Financial Expert, R.K. Narayan
Stalingrad, Theodor Plievier
The New Meaning of Treason, Rebecca West
Richer by Asia, Edmond Taylor
Poet's Choice, edited by Paul Engle and Joseph Langland
In Hazard, Hughes
The Leopard, Giuseppe di Lampedusa
A Coffin for King Charles, Wedgwood

References

External links
TRP debut announcement at Time.com website

Defunct book publishing companies of the United States
Time (magazine)
Direct marketing
Publishing companies established in 1962
Book clubs
Time Life book series